When I Fall in Love is an album by the Mehldau & Rossy Trio, consisting of pianist Brad Mehldau, bassist Mario Rossy, and drummer Jorge Rossy.

Music and recording
The album was recorded in concert at La Cova del Drac in Barcelona on October 9 and 10, 1993.

On the up-tempo "Anthropology", Mehldau plays the melody "note for note and then begins to move through the lower register for sevenths and ninths, playing 16th and even 32nd notes to corral the rhythm section as he moves the scale over first a half, then a whole, and then two and a half steps."

Reception
The AllMusic reviewer wrote that "This may not be as great as some of Meldau's later trio work, but it is very impressive for such an early date."

Track listing
"Anthropology" (Charlie Parker) – 8:22
"At a Loss" (Brad Mehldau) – 6:32
"When I Fall in Love" (Victor Young, Edward Heyman) – 14:20
"Countdown" (John Coltrane) – 8:16
"Convalescent" (Mehldau) – 8:22
"I Fall in Love Too Easily" (Jule Styne, Sammy Cahn) – 10:35
"I Didn't Know What Time It Was" (Richard Rodgers, Lorenz Hart) – 9:40

Personnel
 Brad Mehldau – piano
 Mario Rossy – bass
 Jorge Rossy – drums

References

Brad Mehldau albums
1993 live albums
Collaborative albums